The Múscraighe (older spelling: Músgraige) were an important Érainn people of Munster, descending from Cairpre Músc, son of Conaire Cóem, a High King of Ireland. Closely related were the Corcu Duibne, Corcu Baiscind, both of Munster, and also the Dál Riata of Ulster and Scotland, all being referred to as the Síl Conairi in Irish and Scottish legends. A more distant ancestor was the legendary monarch Conaire Mór, son of Eterscél, son of Íar, son of Dedu mac Sin.

While the Múscraige petty kingdoms were scattered throughout the province of Munster, the largest were centred on the present baronies of Muskerry (West and East) in central Cork.
The tribes or septs were pre-Eóganachta, that is before the 6th century. At this time, the territory of Múscraige Mittaine did not extend south of the River Lee (although the river bisects the current baronies). A pedigree of the chieftains of the tribe may be found in the Book of Leinster.
The main septs were:

Importantly, they acted as vassals and facilitators for the rising Eóganachta.

A King of Munster from the Múscraige was Flaithbertach mac Inmainén.

Notes

References

 Francis John Byrne. Irish Kings and High-Kings. Four Courts Press. 2nd revised edition, 2001.
 Thomas Charles-Edwards, Early Christian Ireland. Cambridge University Press. 2000.
 Lucius Gwynn, "De Maccaib Conaire", in Ériu 6 (1912): 144–53.
 Lucius Gwynn, "De Sil Chonairi Móir", in Ériu 6 (1912): 130–43.
 Vernam Hull. "The Later Version of the Expulsion of the Déssi", in Zeitschrift für celtische Philologie 27 (1958-9): 14–63.
 Paul MacCotter. Medieval Ireland: Territorial, Political and Economic Divisions. Four Courts Press. 2008.
Eoin MacNeill. "Early Irish Population Groups: their nomenclature, classification and chronology", in Proceedings of the Royal Irish Academy (C) 29. 1911. pp. 59–114
 T. F. O'Rahilly. Early Irish History and Mythology. Dublin Institute for Advanced Studies. 1946.

Historical Celtic peoples
Érainn
Tribes of ancient Ireland